Foinikas may refer to:

 Foinikas, Crete
 Foinikas, Cyprus
Foinikas (river)